"Silent Hill" is a song by American rappers Kendrick Lamar and Kodak Black. It was sent to rhythmic contemporary radio and urban contemporary radio through PGLang, Top Dawg Entertainment, Aftermath Entertainment, and Interscope Records as the first US single from Lamar's fifth studio album, Mr. Morale & the Big Steppers, on May 31, 2022. The song was produced by Boi-1da, Sounwave, and Jahaan Sweet, with additional production by Beach Noise. "Silent Hill" contains "crisp, lighter beats". In the chorus, Lamar claims that he is "pushing the snakes, I'm pushing the fakes, I'm pushing them all off me like, 'Huh!'".

Critical reception
NME music critic Kyann-Sian Williams felt that Lamar was inspired by the "loose rap style" of his cousin, fellow American rapper and record producer Baby Keem on "Silent Hill", which is highlighted by the "animated Kendrick voice we all love" in the chorus. Matthew Trammell of Pitchfork was reminded of DaBaby and Marilyn Manson's guest appearances on Kanye West's song, "Jail pt. 2", from the latter's tenth studio album, Donda  (2021), due to Kodak's involvement in the song, explaining that "it's unclear whether his presence is meant to make a case for redemption or musical kinship". Writing for Rolling Stone, Jeff Ihaza conversely remarked that "in the hands of just about any other rapper, the song would read as nothing more than post Playboi Carti-era pastiche, but Kendrick finds new terrain, retracing over unexplored horizons" and "he tries out about three different cadences before Kodak Black, a perfect guest feature on the beat, arrives to deliver a case study on melodic rap".

Credits and personnel

 Kendrick Lamar – vocals, songwriting
 Kodak Black – vocals, songwriting
 Boi-1da – production, songwriting
 Sounwave – production, songwriting
 Jahaan Sweet – production, songwriting
 Beach Noise
 Matt Schaeffer – additional production, songwriting, engineering
 Johnny Kosich – additional production, songwriting
 Jake Kosich – additional production, songwriting
 Manny Marroquin – mixing
 Michelle Mancini – mastering
 Derek Garcia – engineering
 Johnathan Turner – engineering
 Ray Charles Brown, Jr. – engineering
 Andrew Boyd – recording assistance
 Wesley Seidman – recording assistance

Charts

Weekly charts

Year-end charts

Release history

References

2022 singles
2022 songs
Aftermath Entertainment singles
Interscope Records singles
Kendrick Lamar songs
Kodak Black songs
Songs written by Kendrick Lamar
Songs written by Kodak Black
Songs written by Boi-1da
Songs written by Sounwave
Song recordings produced by Boi-1da
Top Dawg Entertainment singles